Diplostomidae is a family of trematodes in the order Diplostomida.

Genera
Austrodiplostomum Szidat & Nani, 1951
Bolbophorus Dubois, 1935
Bursacetabulus Tehrany, Dronen & Wardle, 1999
Bursatintinnabulus Tehrany, Dronen & Wardle, 1999
Diplostomum Nordmann, 1832
Harvardia Baer, 1932
Hysteromorpha Lutz, 1931
Mesoophorodiplostomum Dubois, 1936
Neodiplostomum Railliet, 1919
Posthodiplostomum Dubois, 1936
Tylodelphys Diesing, 1850
Additionally, the World Register of Marine Species lists Diplostomulum as a larval group name.

References

Diplostomida